Plus Ultra Líneas Aéreas S.A. is a Spanish long-haul airline based at Adolfo Suárez Madrid–Barajas Airport.

History
Plus Ultra was founded in 2011 by the former director of now defunct Air Madrid, Julio Miguel Martínez Sola. Plus ultra ("Further beyond") is a Latin motto and the national motto of Spain. It is taken from the personal motto of Charles V, Holy Roman Emperor and King of Spain, and is a reversal of the original phrase Non plus ultra ("Nothing further beyond").

On 15 June 2016 the airline started operating regular flights, with destinations such as Santo Domingo and Lima. The initial fleet was made up of two pre-owned Airbus A340-300s which had been taken over from Gulf Air in late 2014. In March 2017, the airline announced two new routes: Barcelona-Madrid-Santiago from 15 June 2017 and Barcelona-Havana from 1 July 2017 which however both were not commenced. One year later, Plus Ultra announced planned to serve Caracas from Tenerife–North.

In March 2021, the Spanish government announced an aid of 53 million euros from the fund created to support companies considered strategic during the economic crisis derived from COVID-19.

Destinations
As of February 2023, Plus Ultra Líneas Aéreas operates scheduled flights to the following destinations:

Codeshare agreement
Plus Ultra has an codeshare agreement with LASER Airlines to offer flights to Porlamar.

Fleet

Current fleet

As of December 2022, the Plus Ultra fleet consists of the following aircraft:

Former fleet
Plus Ultra previously operated the following aircraft:

See also
List of airlines of Spain

References

External links

Airlines established in 2011
Airlines of Spain
Companies based in Madrid
Spanish brands
Spanish companies established in 2011